Waldo Grant (born November 3, 1946) is an American serial killer who murdered four young gay men in New York City between 1973 and 1976. He later confessed to the killings after being questioned by police about his fourth murder, and was subsequently sentenced to life in prison.

Personal life 
Waldo Grant was born in Georgia on November 3, 1946. When he turned 16, he became a self-ordained minister for a black gospel church. In 1971, he moved north to escape a failed marriage, eventually settling into an apartment on Manhattan's Upper West Side. Although his neighbors described him as a quiet loner, he was somewhat-well known throughout Upper West Side's gay community.

Murders 

 Phillip Mitchell – On September 13, 1973, Grant murdered 20-year-old Phillip Mitchell by hitting him over the head with a lead pipe. He then dragged Mitchell's body to the roof of 203 West 91 Street. In an attempt to make the murder look like an accident, he threw Mitchell's corpse off the roof and into a rear yard. Grant stated he killed Phillip Mitchell because he demanded money after sex and started rummaging through Grant's closet. However, this claim has not been substantiated. Grant and other residents of the apartment building were questioned about the murder, but no arrests were made.
 George Muniz – Almost two years later, the body of 23-year-old George Muniz was found in a metal trash can in front of a house at 210 West 91st Street, a half of a block away from Grant's apartment, where the murder occurred. He had been stabbed multiple times in the throat and back.
 Harold Phillips – On October 3, 1976, 22-year-old Harold Phillips was beaten to death with a hammer in his own apartment at 27 East 124th Street.
 Harry Garillo – On December 29, 1976, the dismembered body of 16-year-old Harry Carillo was discovered by children playing on a path in Central Park. Grant, who knew the victim for about six months, had cut his naked body into three pieces with a saw and put his remains into three green garbage bags. He then transported Carillo's remains to Central Park using a shopping cart.

Arrest and imprisonment 
Since he was the last person to be seen with Harry Garillo, Grant soon became a suspect in his murder. Police questioned him multiple times over the span of two weeks. On January 10, 1977, police brought Grant back for questioning, presenting him with circumstantial evidence which connected him to Garillo's murder. After being questioned for five hours, Grant confessed to Garillo's murder, stating "Harry is very attractive to me and I desire him very much and that was the only way I could get him." A short time later, he confessed to the three other murders, proclaiming that he had an "uncontrollable urge to kill." On June 30, 1978, he was found guilty of the four murders and sentenced to four concurrent life sentences. He now resides at the Green Haven Correctional Facility.

See also 
 Crime in New York City
 List of serial killers in the United States
 List of people sentenced to more than one life imprisonment

References 

1973 murders in the United States
1975 murders in the United States
1976 murders in the United States
20th-century American criminals
20th-century American LGBT people
American male criminals
American murderers of children
American prisoners sentenced to life imprisonment
American serial killers
Criminals from Georgia (U.S. state)
Gay men
Male serial killers
Murder in New York City
People convicted of murder by New York (state)
Prisoners sentenced to life imprisonment by New York (state)
Violence against gay men in the United States
Violence against men in North America
Living people
1946 births